Ida Silfverberg (1834–1899) was a Finnish painter who painted in Germany, France and Italy.

Silfverberg was born in Helsinki and by age 15, she began painting copies of paintings at the Finnish Art Association's exhibition in 1849. She went on to paint copies of paintings by Dutch artists in the collection of the Gemaldegalerie Alte Meister in Dresden. In 1860, she won the second prize for the Finnish Ducat Competition for the promotion of young artists and in 1862, she won the first prize in the same competition. 

Her Woman teaching a Child to Read was purchased by the Serliachus Museum as being by Pehr Hilleström and her true signature was only recently discovered after the forged Hillstrom signature was found to be fraudulent.

Silfverberg died in Florence. She is known as a copyist and portraitist as well as for her genre scenes.

References

1834 births
1899 deaths
19th-century Finnish women artists
Artists from Helsinki
Finnish women painters
Finnish expatriates in France
Finnish expatriates in Germany
Finnish expatriates in Italy